The Bat is a Vekoma Suspended Family Coaster located at Lagoon Amusement Park in Farmington, Utah, United States.

History
The Bat debuted at Lagoon Amusement Park on April 16, 2005. Lagoon had hoped to open the Bat on the opening day of the 2005 season on April 9, but the opening was delayed a week. It was built on the site of the Lake Park Terrace, a pavilion moved to Lagoon from the park's original location on the shore of the Great Salt Lake. The Terrace was removed on October 12, 2004, to make room for the new roller coaster, as the structure's deterioration had passed the point of feasible maintenance. It was one of four roller coasters added to the park in a 10-year span, and the first to use a magnetic braking system. The Bat was the third 'family-friendly' ride, allowing both adults and children, to be installed in the park, following the Kontiki and Dragon Fly flat rides installed in 2004. The ride was also the first inverted roller coaster for the park.

Ride Description
The Bat begins with a turn out of the station and up a pinch wheel lift, into a series of helixes and small hills around the bat cave and other themed features and trees. The Bat comes to an end with as the train is slowed by magnetic brakes and returns to the station.

Theme
The ride theming is based on bats. The ride façade and queue area resembling a cave with roosting bats, and the light coverings in the station area are decorated with images of bats. The ride track is painted purple with green supports, and the train is black and purple with orange restraints. As of 2008, The Bat is the only roller coaster at Lagoon with over-the-shoulder restraints.

References

Inverted roller coasters
Roller coasters in Utah
Lagoon (amusement park)
2005 establishments in Utah